Utrophin is a protein that in humans is encoded by the UTRN gene.

The protein encoded by this gene is a component of the cytoskeleton. Utrophin was found during research into Duchenne's muscular dystrophy. The name is a contraction for ubiquitous dystrophin. The 900 kb gene for utrophin is found on the long arm of  human chromosome 6. Utrophin was discovered due to its homology with dystrophin. It was found by screening a peptide containing the C-terminal domain of dystrophin against cDNA libraries. The homology varies over its full length from less than 30% in regions of the central rod structural domain to 85% (identity 73%) for the actin binding domain.

The tertiary structure of utrophin contains a C-terminus that consists of protein–protein interaction motifs that interact with dystroglycan, a central rod region consisting of a triple coiled-coil repeat, and an actin-binding N-terminus.

In normal muscle cells, utrophin is located at the neuromuscular synapse and myotendinous junctions. It is necessary for normal membrane maintenance, and for the clustering of the  acetylcholine receptor. In adult humans, utrophin RNA is found ubiquitously, as the name implies, being  abundant in the brain,  kidney, liver, lung, muscle, spleen and stomach. In the human fetus during muscle differentiation, utrophin is found at the sarcolemma. It disappears when the fetus begins to express dystrophin.

Utrophin expression is dramatically increased in patients with Duchenne's muscular dystrophy (and female carriers), both in those muscle fibers lacking dystrophin and in rare, revertant fibers that express dystrophin.

No reports have yet associated mutation in the utrophin gene with disease, but it does not seem to play a critical role in development, since mice without utrophin develop normally.

See also
 dystrophin

References

Further reading

External links
 

Cytoskeleton
Muscular dystrophy
Cell adhesion proteins